Ridgefield may refer to:

Places
Ridgefield, Connecticut, a New England town
Ridgefield (CDP), Connecticut, a village in the town of Ridgefield
Ridgefield Playhouse, a theater located in Ridgefield
Ridgefield, New Jersey
Ridgefield Park, New Jersey
Ridgefield Township, New Jersey
Ridgefield, Washington, a city in Clark County, Washington
Ridgefield Township, Huron County, Ohio

Other uses
 Battle of Ridgefield, a battle in the American Revolution
Ridgefield High School (disambiguation)